George Eves Tall Chief (November 21, 1916 – August 11, 2013) was an American educator. He served as a chief in the Osage Nation.

Born in Arkansas City, Kansas, Tall Chief received his bachelor's degree from University of Central Oklahoma and his masters from Pacific University. Tall Chief taught history, nutrition and physical education in Oregon, Idaho, and Oklahoma. He also coached wrestling, football, and baseball. He was also a scout for the Baltimore Colts and liaison representative between Pacific University and the Dallas Cowboys. He served as chief of the Osage Nation 1982–1990. He then served as the president of the first Osage National Council. He died in Fairfax, Oklahoma.

Notes

1916 births
2013 deaths
People from Arkansas City, Kansas
University of Central Oklahoma alumni
Pacific University alumni
Central Oklahoma Bronchos football players
Osage people
Native American leaders
Players of American football from Kansas
Native American sportspeople
People from Fairfax, Oklahoma